= Mr. Baan's Bar and Mookata =

Restaurant in Phoenix, Arizona, U.S.

- Interactive map of Mr. Baan's Bar and Mookata

Restaurant information
- Location: 218 East Portland Street, Phoenix, Arizona, 85004, United States
- Coordinates: 33°27′37″N 112°04′13″W

Mr. Baan's Bar and Mookata is a restaurant in Phoenix, Arizona. It was included in The New York Times's 2024 list of the 50 best restaurants in the United States.
